The Glorious Dead is the third studio album by English rock band The Heavy. It was released on 20 August 2012 and has been described as a "quirky take on rootsy soul-influenced music." It peaked at #191 on the Billboard 200.

Critical reception
Consequence of Sound wrote that the album "incorporates guitar-driven hard rock, bringing the band closer to the mainstream, which happens to be full of blues nerds just like them."

Track listing

Personnel 
The Heavy
 Kelvin Swaby – vocals
 Dan Taylor – guitar
 Spencer Page – bass
 Chris Ellul – drums
Producing
 Paul Corkett - producing, mixing, recording
 The Heavy - producing, mixing, recording
 Gabriel Roth - additional recording
 Hal Ritson - additional recording
 Rob Dowell - additional recording
 Lloyd Buchanan - gospel scoring

References

2012 albums
The Heavy (band) albums
Ninja Tune albums